Ciyun Temple, may refer to:

 Ciyun Temple (Huai'an), in Huai'an, Jiangsu, China
 Ciyun Temple (Chongqing), in Nan'an District of Chongqing, China